Marilyn Neeley (December 26, 1937 - May 30, 2007) was an American pianist. She won the Los Angeles Times Woman of the Year in Music award in 1963 and an Emmy Award in 1970.

References 

1937 births
2007 deaths
American classical pianists
Women classical pianists
20th-century American pianists
20th-century classical pianists
20th-century American women pianists
21st-century American pianists
21st-century classical pianists
21st-century American women pianists
Emmy Award winners
University of Southern California alumni
Ohio State University faculty
University of Maryland, Baltimore County faculty
Florida State University faculty
Catholic University of America faculty
American women academics